Mount Zion Demonstration State Forest is located in  the town of Pine Grove, Amador County, California, United States. It features a ranger lookout station and microwave tower atop Mount Zion, which is accessed via Mount Zion Road from California State Route 88.

References

External links
 History of Mt. Zion Fire Lookout Tower, California Lookouts
 Mount Zion Lookout (photo), State of California, Department of Forestry
 Demonstration forests in California

Protected areas of Amador County, California
California state forests